Georg Hans Jeitler (born 27 September 1979), also referred as Georg H. Jeitler, is an Austrian entrepreneur, lecturer and forensic economist based in Vienna, Austria. He has served as a judiciary's expert witness and investigator in several Austrian corruption scandals including Telekom Austria Affair and Tetron Affair.

Early life and education
Jeitler was born in Vienna, Austria, in 1979. He attended University of Vienna where he received his  Bachelor's and Master's degree in communication science. Later, he attended the Austrian Institute of Management at the University of Applied Sciences, Burgenland and received his MBA degree in Management Consultancy. Jeitler is a  certified management consultant and a certified expert witness.

Career 
In 2000, Jeitler established an advertising agency. Over the years, his focus shifted towards communications consultancy and business advisory which ultimately led to specializing in business compliance topics. In 2019, Jeitler became a partner at Grant Thornton Austria in the field of forensic practice. Since 2011, he has served as a certified expert witness for the Austrian judiciary and private clients. His work as an expert witness has been subject to news coverage of several Austrian political affairs.

Notable expert witness work

Telekom Austria Affair 

The Telekom Austria affair is one of the major party donations' scandals in Austrian politics history. Jeitler’s work led to the conviction of several Austrian politicians and business persons, most notably Gernot Rumpold. In 2004, Rumpold’s marketing and PR firm "mediaConnection" had sold four business concepts to Telekom Austria for EUR 600,000. Jeitler proved that these concepts were of no use, and, therefore, worth significantly less than what Telekom Austria had paid for them. This made it evident that the business concepts were sold to cover an illegal party donation to the right-wing party FPÖ. The court sentenced Rumpold, besides other defendants, to three years in prison without parole.

Carinthia Brochure Affair 
During the 2009 state parliament election campaign, the State of Carinthia issued a EUR 400,000 image brochure. It was suspected that this brochure was made so that it would not advertise the State of Carinthia but the political party BZÖ (originated from FPÖ) instead. Eventually, this led to indictment of several BZÖ politicians, including Carinthia’s then governor Gerhard Dörfler. Jeitler empirically proved to the court that the advertising brochure was indeed primarily advertising the BZÖ, and not the state of Carinthia.

Tetron Affair 

The Austrian police, fire brigade, and emergency medical service sought to introduce a standardized digital radio system in 2004. The Tetron consortium (Motorola, Alcatel, Telekom Austria) was eventually chosen to develop this system. In investigation proceedings and later in a 2014/2015 court case, Jeitler proved that, in 2008, Alfons Mensdorff-Pouilly had received a bribe payment of EUR 1.1 million from Rudolf Fischer, then chairman of Telekom Austria. Lobbyist Mensdorff-Pouilly had made the interior ministry choose Tetron for the new radio system. Mensdorff-Pouilly was sentenced to three years in prison without parole.

Mediaselect Affair 
In 2012, the Austrian judiciary investigated suspicions of obfuscated party donations to the christian-conservative ÖVP. From 2002 until 2008, Austrian companies seemed to have donated to the ÖVP through the media agency Mediaselect. In 2013, Georg Jeitler was appointed as judicial expert witness in investigation proceedings. The defendants were incriminated by Jeitler’s findings that billed services had not been rendered at arm’s length and had no value in return.

Personal life
Jeitler is married to an Austrian Member of Parliament Carmen Jeitler-Cincelli, with three children, and they reside in Vienna.

References 

University of Vienna alumni
Austrian company founders
Forensic scientists
Businesspeople from Vienna
1979 births
Living people
21st-century Austrian businesspeople
Scientists from Vienna